The small red damselfly (Ceriagrion tenellum) is a small damselfly flying in heathland bogs and streams. It is in the family Coenagrionidae.

Identification
It is a lot shorter than the large red damselfly, with which it is sometimes confused. In both sexes the thorax is bronze-black on top.

The male has an entirely red abdomen.

The female has a bronze-black abdomen with only the front and back of it red. The dark form melanogastrum has an almost entirely dark abdomen marked with pale segment divisors, the last two of which are reddish. A very rare form, erythrogastrum, resembles the male.

Behaviour
Adults fly low and weakly, rarely going far from breeding waters. Like the southern damselfly, which this species sometimes accompanies, they rarely fly in any but the warmest and calmest weather conditions. They can, however, be surprisingly inconspicuous, even the males.

The males are aggressive towards each other but are not territorial. Oviposition takes place in tandem.

Eggs and larvae
It lays elongated eggs in submerged and emergent plants which subsequently hatch after about a month. They live among debris in bogs and develop after two years.

References

External links
 

Coenagrionidae
Damselflies of Europe
Insects described in 1789
Taxa named by Charles Joseph Devillers